Armel Hostiou is a French filmmaker.

Career

Hostiou studied at La Fémis cinema school in Paris, he graduated in 2003. Then he directed several short films, SoloS, Contre Temps, Lost You, Chorus, Kino, World was on Fire and No One Could Save Me But You, Psycho Motion, La ville bleue.

Those films won different awards in film festivals Best experimental Film Tel Aviv 2004 for SoloS, Audience Award Munich 2006 for Contre Temps, Jury Award San Francisco Independent Exposure 2008 for Kino, Audience Award San Francisco Metacafe Festival 2009 for World was on Fire and no one could save me but You. Hostiou also directed music videos for French and American bands (Babx, Fantazio, Poni Hoax, Limousine, DM Stith, Foma) and some experimental films and video installations.

Day, his first feature film, produced by Bocalupo Films was premiered at the Cannes film festival in 2011 in the Acid selection. The U.S. premiere took place at the European Film festival in the Miami Beach Cinematheque as the opening film of the festival.

In 2013 he shot in New York his second feature film, also produced by Bocalupo Films, Stubborn (Une histoire americaine, French title), starring Vincent Macaigne and Kate Moran.
The film is released in France in February 2015 by UFO Distribution. The U.S. premiere took place in New York at Lincoln Center as part of the 20th "Rendez-Vous with French cinema" film festival in March 2015.

Filmography

Feature films 

 2012: Day
 2015: Stubborn

Short films

 2003: SoloS 
 2004: Kino 
 2004: Chorus 
 2005: Contre Temps 
 2006: World was on fire and no one could save me but you 
 2008: Lost You 
 2012: Psycho Motion
 2013: Kingston Avenue

Music videos

 2005: De Saragosse à Barcelone - Julien Ribot - Ici, d'ailleurs...
 2006: Seven Days - Fantazio - La Triperie
 2006: Crack Maniac - Babx - Warner Music
 2007: Cœur Larsen - Babx - Warner Music
 2007: Bains de minuit - Babx - Warner Music
 2008: Vanita - Toma Fetermix - Musikaction
 2009: Sirènes - Delphine Volange - Labelenchanteur
 2009: Do look back- Suicide - Kochka Da Cat
 2009: Terra Incognita - Foma - Inverness
 2009: BMB - DM Stith - Asthmatic Kitty Records
 2009: Bons baisers d'Islamabad - Babx - Warner Music
 2009: Electrochocs Ladyland - Babx - Warner Music
 2009: De Haut en Bas - Arlt - Almost Musique
 2009: The brightest side - Fantazio - La Triperie
 2010: Hypernuit - Bertrand Belin - Label Cinq 7
 2010: Even If - Limousine - Ekler’o’shock Records
 2010: La mort des amants - Babx - Warner Music
 2010: Carrie Ann - Poni Hoax & Babx - Tigersushi
 2011: Tes bonnes choses - Louis Bertignac - Polydor
 2012: Despote Paranoïa - Babx - Label Cinq 7
 2013: Tchador Woman - Babx - Label Cinq 7
 2013: Naomi Aime - Babx - Label Cinq 7
 2013: There's nothing left for you here - Poni Hoax - Paneuropean Recordings
 2013: Je ne t'ai jamais aimé - Babx - Label Cinq 7
 2013: Lucile - Ghost Dance - Label La Fugitive
 2014: Helsinki - Babx - Label Cinq 7
 2015: Lost - Arcan

Experimental

 2005: Everything is mental - Moscow Digital Act 2011
 2006: Chute, 1 & 2 - Exposition Permanence, Orangerie de Sucy 2006
 2006: Ondes (rêver immobile) - Théâtre de Bonneuil 2007
 2007: Les petites statues - Kunsthaus Luxembourg Capitale européenne de la culture 2007
 2007: Anatomie d'une ville  Translocated, Londres 2010
 2007: Wall Times, 1 & 2 - Melilla (2007) - Ramallah (2009)
 2008: Sensations - Rimbaudmania, Bibliothèque historique de la ville de Paris 2010
 2008: Laps - Espace Landowski, Boulogne 2009
 2008: Traces - Dans la nuit, des images- Grand Palais, Paris 2008
 2010: Niobe - Le quai de la batterie, Arras 2010
 2011: Chili - Art of Travelling #1
 2012: Flota - Curtis R. Priem Experimental Media and Performing Arts Center EMPAC
 2012: Watch Thru Me - Curtis R. Priem Experimental Media and Performing Arts Center EMPAC
 2013: Stellar (Region) - Innermap
 2014: Duende - Musée Picasso - Nuit Blanche Paris 2014

Awards 

 2004: Best experimental Film, SoloS, Tel Aviv international student film festival 
 2004: Prix BAC cinéma, SoloS, Rencontres cinématographiques de Digne 
 2004: Prix SACEM, SoloS, Festival des e-magiciens, Valenciennes 
 2005: Max Ophuls preis, Chorus, Saarbrücken Film festival 
 2006: Audience Award, Contre Temps, FFAT Festival Munich 2007: Prix du clip le plus créatif de l'année, Seven Days, Le Monde.fr 
 2008: Geografias de la imagen, Anatomie d'une ville Fundacion Ars Teore-tica 
 2008: Selected music video 2008, BMB (can't say goodbye), YouTube US 
 2008: Jury Award, Kino, San Francisco Independent Exposure 
 2009: Audience Award, Metafest, World was on fire and no one could save me but you, San Francisco 
 2012: Curator's choice, Rives, Young French Cinema at B.A.M. - New York 2015: Young Programmers Award, Une histoire américaine'', Festival de cine europeo de Sevilla

References

External links
 Armel Hostiou's website
 

French film directors
1976 births
Living people
Mass media people from Rennes
French screenwriters